Webster Peaks is a group of four rocky peaks, 1065 m, standing west of Whitecloud Glacier at the head of Charcot Bay on Davis Coast, the west coast of Graham Land in Antarctica. Charted by the Falkland Islands Dependencies Survey (FIDS) in 1948, and named for W.H.B. Webster, medical officer and naturalist on the Chanticleer, which approached Tower and Trinity Islands off this coast in 1829.

Mountains of Graham Land
Davis Coast